The Bottle & Fresh Horses is the second and final album by the alternative rock band the Refreshments, released in 1997.

Production
The album was produced by Paul Leary.

Critical reception
The Washington Post thought that "new songs as 'Buy American' and 'Fonder and Blonder' aren't quite so droll as the material on last year's Fizzy Fuzzy Big & Buzzy, but they do have an appealing good humor that complements their exuberant melodies." Trouser Press concluded that "'Heaven or the Highway Out of Town' and 'Good Year' are peppy little numbers, but it might as well be .38 Special playing them." 

Billboard wrote that "the band's comic slant takes a back seat to its highly underrated songwriting." The San Antonio Express-News determined that "the music is carefully crafted, but it's also deadly serious—not to mention more country-and heartland-rock oriented."

AllMusic called the album "one of the best forgotten gems of its time," writing that "the group dreamed up an earnest, dustier sound, blending heartland rock & roll with elements of country and power-pop."

Track listing
All songs written by Roger Clyne and Paul "P.H." Naffah except where noted:
 "Tributary Otis" - 4:55  
 "Preacher's Daughter" - 3:22
 "Wanted" - 3:34
 "Sin Nombre" - 5:27
 "Heaven or the Highway Out of Town" - 3:26 (Blush)
 "Buy American" - 4:01
 "Dolly" - 3:41
 "Good Year" - 3:15 (Blush)
 "Fonder and Blonder" - 4:07
 "Birds Sing" - 3:18 (Edwards)
 "Horses" - 4:19
 "Broken Record" - 3:42
 "Una Soda" - 4:46

References

1997 albums
The Refreshments (U.S. band) albums
Mercury Records albums